Edwin Martin may refer to:

 Edwin M. Martin (1908–2002), American diplomat and government official
 Edward S. Martin (a.k.a. Edwin S. Martin, 1840–1901), American Civil War sailor and Medal of Honor recipient
 Edwin W. Martin (1917–1991), American diplomat
 Edwin Barnard Martin, member of the British Free Corps during the Second World War
 Edwin Martin (1860–1915), English potter with the Martin Brothers
 Ned Martin (1923–2002), American sportscaster
 Edwin W. Martin, Jr., American Assistant Secretary of Education for Special Education and Rehabilitation Services

See also 
 Edward Martin (disambiguation)